Rugby (Sevens and Union) was one of the many sports which was held at the 1998 Asian Games in Bangkok, Thailand from December 7 to December 18, 1998.

Schedule

Medalists

Union

Sevens

Medal table

Final standing

Union

Sevens

References
 Results

 
rugby union
1998
1998 rugby union tournaments for national teams
International rugby union competitions hosted by Thailand
1998 in Asian rugby union